The Costa Rica 1950 Census was elaborated by then , predecessor of current National Institute of Statistics and Census. The total population was at the moment .

Results by canton

References

Censuses in Costa Rica
1950 in Costa Rica
1950 censuses